Rome Township is one of sixteen townships in Jefferson County, Illinois, USA.  As of the 2010 census, its population was 1,669 and it contained 771 housing units.

Geography
The township is centered at 38°26'N 88°59'W (38.430, −88.976). It is traversed north–south by Interstate Route 57 and State Route 37.

Cities, towns, villages
 Dix

Unincorporated towns
 Boyd at 
(This list is based on USGS data and may include former settlements.)

Adjacent townships
 Raccoon Township, Marion County (north)
 Haines Township, Marion County (northeast)
 Field Township (east)
 Mt. Vernon Township (southeast)
 Shiloh Township (south)
 Casner Township (southwest)
 Grand Prairie Township (west)
 Centralia Township, Marion County (northwest)

Cemeteries
The township contains these seven cemeteries: Boyd, Boyd Farm, Ebenezer, Gilead, Jennings Farm, Little Grove and Pleasant Hill.

Major highways
  Interstate 57

Demographics

Political districts
 Illinois' 19th congressional district
 State House District 107
 State Senate District 54

References
 
 United States Census Bureau 2007 TIGER/Line Shapefiles
 United States National Atlas

External links
 City-Data.com
 Illinois State Archives

Townships in Jefferson County, Illinois
Mount Vernon, Illinois micropolitan area
Townships in Illinois